Langham Hotels International Limited, trading as Langham Hospitality Group, is a hotel operator with its headquarters in Hong Kong. The oldest hotel in its portfolio, The Langham, London, originally opened in 1865 as Europe's first 'Grand Hotel'.

Today, the group covers four continents, with projects located in cities and resorts around the world, including Auckland, Bangkok, Beijing, Boston, Gold Coast, Guangzhou, Hong Kong, Jakarta, London, Los Angeles, Melbourne, New York, Phuket, Shanghai, Shenzhen, Sydney and Toronto. The group's expansion continues with its two brands, 'The Langham Hotels and Resorts' and 'Cordis Hotels and Resorts', as well as its affiliate hotels.

Langham Hotels International Limited is wholly owned by Great Eagle Holdings, one of Hong Kong's leading property companies, which was founded in 1963 and is listed on the Hong Kong Stock Exchange.

History

Langham Hospitality Group claims a history that dates back to 1865, when The Langham hotel in London opened as the then-largest building in London and Europe's first 'Grand Hotel'. Ten stories and 156 feet high, The Langham featured 15,000 yards of Persian tapestry, hot and cold running water in every guestroom, the world's first hydraulic lifts, known as 'rising rooms', and even an early form of air-conditioning. Upon opening The Langham, the then Prince of Wales hailed the hotel as having "everything a man, woman or child could desire under one roof".

The Langham has since hosted royal, political and cultural dignitaries and celebrities, including French emperor Napoleon III and wits and writers Oscar Wilde and Mark Twain. However, the hotel closed during World War II and after the war was bought by the BBC and used as office space until 1986, when it was sold to the Ladbroke Group (which also purchased the non-US Hilton hotels) and reopened as the Langham Hilton hotel in 1991.

The Langham was sold to Great Eagle Holdings in 1995. Great Eagle used the 'Langham' brand to rebadge a number of hotels in its portfolio, thus creating the Langham Hospitality Group. Great Eagle has subsequently purchased further hotels and rebadged them as 'Langham' hotels. It has also moved other hotel brands within its portfolio into the Langham Hospitality Group.

Company

Langham Hospitality Group is a wholly owned subsidiary (as Langham Hotels International Limited) of Great Eagle Holdings. It not only oversees the operations and performance of its own hotels, but also provides professional management services to its developer- or owner-partners.

Langham Hospitality Group is the hospitality arm of Great Eagle Holdings, one of Hong Kong's leading property and hotel companies. Great Eagle Holdings invests in, develops and manages office, retail, residential and hotel properties in Asia, North America and Europe. The organisation is also active in property management and maintenance services, as well as building materials trading.thrive on change. The latest manifestation of this entrepreneurial approach to embracing challenges is the company’s recent move to Microsoft 365. Bringing together Office 365, Windows 10, and Enterprise Mobility + Security, this complete, intelligent solution empowers employees to work together in highly secure digital environments.

Great Eagle Holdings was founded in 1963 with the incorporation of The Great Eagle Company Limited, which was listed on the Hong Kong Stock Exchange in 1972. In 1990, following a reorganisation, Great Eagle Holdings Limited, incorporated in Bermuda, became the listed holding company of Great Eagle in place of The Great Eagle Company Limited.

Langham Hospitality Group has an extensive hotel portfolio with over 4721 rooms, the breakdown of which is provided below:

The group also owns the 1,590-room Chelsea Hotel in Toronto.

Notable hotels

 The Langham, Boston
 The Langham, Hong Kong
 The Langham, London
 The Langham, Melbourne
 The Langham, New York, Fifth Avenue
 The Langham Huntington, Pasadena
 The Langham, Seattle (future)
 The Langham, Sydney
 The Langham, Jakarta
 Cordis, Hong Kong
 Cordis, Auckland
 Chelsea Hotel, Toronto

Michelin-starred restaurants
The hotel chain operates Michelin-starred Chinese restaurants, three-star T'ang Court in The Langham, Hong Kong, and two-star Ming Court in Cordis Hong Kong. Both sets of ratings were received in the 2013 Hong Kong and Macau edition of the Michelin Guide.

References

External links
 

Hotel chains
Multinational companies headquartered in Hong Kong
Hospitality companies of Hong Kong
Hong Kong brands